The 2011 AAA 400 was a NASCAR Cup Series stock car race that was held on October 2, 2011, at Dover International Speedway in Dover, Delaware.

Contested 400 laps on the 1.000-mile (1.609 km) concrete oval, it was the 29th race of the 2011 Sprint Cup Series season, as well as the third race in the ten-race Chase for the Sprint Cup, which ends the season. The race was won by Kurt Busch for the Penske Racing team. Jimmie Johnson finished second, and Carl Edwards clinched third.

A series of racing accidents in addition to a brief bout of rain contributed to the vast amount of cautions that this race endured. While the average green flag run was approximately 32 laps, 11% of the race was run under a caution flag.

References

AAA 400
AAA 400
NASCAR races at Dover Motor Speedway
October 2011 sports events in the United States